The Scahentoarrhonon or Scahentowanenrhonon were a little-known indigenous people of North America originally from the Wyoming Valley, Pennsylvania, which they called Scahentowanen ('It is a very great plain').

History

Little is known of the Scahentoarrhonon. They were recorded in the Jesuit Relation for 1635. They appear to have been destroyed as a tribe by the Iroquois in 1652 during the Beaver Wars. Survivors may have been assimilated by one or more of the Five Nations.

Language

Scahentoarrhonon was an Iroquoian language, likely related to Susquehannock, Wendat, Erie and Wenrohronon.

References

External links
The Massawomeck: Raiders and Traders into the Chesapeake Bay in the Seventeenth Century

Extinct languages of North America
Indigenous peoples of the Northeastern Woodlands
Native American tribes in Pennsylvania
Languages attested from the 17th century
Languages extinct in the 17th century
Iroquoian peoples